Bramber Castle is an electoral division of West Sussex in the United Kingdom and returns one member to sit on West Sussex County Council.

Extent
The division covers the town of Steyning; and the villages of Ashurst, Botolphs, Bramber, Edburton, Small Dole, Upper Beeding and Woodmancote.

It comprises the following Horsham District wards: Bramber, Upper Beeding & Woodmancote Ward and Steyning Ward; and of the following civil parishes: Ashurst, Bramber, the southern part of Henfield, Steyning, Upper Beeding and Woodmancote.

Election results

2013 Election
Results of the election held on 2 May 2013:

2009 Election
Results of the election held on 4 June 2009:

2005 Election
Results of the election held on  5 May 2005:

References
Election Results - West Sussex County Council

External links
 West Sussex County Council
 Election Maps

Electoral Divisions of West Sussex